Pauline's United Australia Party was an Australian political party launched by One Nation founder Pauline Hanson on 24 May 2007 after disputes within her former party led to her separation from it. It was registered by the Australian Electoral Commission on 20 September 2007.

The party draws on the name but is unrelated to the historic United Australia Party which existed from 1931 to 1945. Hanson formed the party in order to ensure that her name appeared above the line (as per the voting method in Australian federal elections) rather than simply below the line amongst a list of independent candidates.

Hanson stood for the Australian Senate in the state of Queensland during the 2007 federal election, in which she received 101,461 first preference votes, representing 4.2% of the statewide vote.

Brian Burston, Hanson's former One Nation adviser and future Senator, also stood for the Senate in the state of New South Wales and received 39,807 votes, which was nearly 1% of the total votes.

Hanson voluntarily de-registered the party in March 2010 after announcing her intention to relocate to the United Kingdom. Her planned emigration did not occur, but the party remained de-registered.

Federal parliament

References

2007 establishments in Australia
2010 disestablishments in Australia
Political parties established in 2007
Conservative parties in Australia
Anti-immigration politics in Australia
Political parties disestablished in 2010
Defunct far right political parties in Australia
Pauline Hanson's One Nation breakaway groups
Pauline Hanson
Right-wing politics in Australia
Social conservative parties
Defunct nationalist parties
Defunct conservative parties
Right-wing parties
Australian nationalist parties